Clunes railway station is located on the Mildura line in Victoria, Australia. It serves the town of Clunes, and opened on 16 November 1874.

History
The station closed on 12 September 1993, when The Vinelander service to Mildura was withdrawn and replaced by road coaches. It was reinstated on 3 December 2011, as an additional station on the reopened passenger service to Maryborough.

The station, along with parts of the main street, were famously used in the 1979 film Mad Max, when the bikie crew pick up the Nightrider's coffin.

In 1987, Clunes was abolished as an electric staff station, with the signal box, interlocking and signals abolished. In March 2010, a new 140-metre siding was provided opposite the platform, to stable track machines.

When rail passenger services to Maryborough resumed in July 2010, Clunes station was not reopened, but in June 2010, it was announced that it would be. On 3 December 2011, a ceremony was held to officially reopen the station, and regular services began stopping there the following day.

Prior to the reopening, contractors working on the station removed the original cast iron veranda, which was sent for scrap, outraging local residents and the local council. By mid-2012, a replacement veranda had been rebuilt.

During 2015, the former station building was refurbished, and was leased out for community use in the same year.

Platforms and services
Clunes has one platform. It is served by V/Line Maryborough line trains.

Platform 1:
 services to Maryborough and Ballarat

Transport links
V/Line operates road coach services via Clunes station, from Ballarat to Donald and Mildura.

References

External links

Rail Geelong gallery
Victorian Railway Stations gallery
Melway map at street-directory.com.au

Railway stations in Australia opened in 1874
Regional railway stations in Victoria (Australia)
Railway stations closed in 1993
Railway stations in Australia opened in 2011